The Casey Emergency Airstrip is a former military airstrip located near the village of Casey, Quebec. Although abandoned as a formal airstrip, today it is popular as a fly-in and camping area for recreational light aircraft enthusiasts.

History
Early during the planning of the airstrip the location was initially named McCarthy, after another nearby village on the railway. The airstrip was constructed between 1952 and 1953 by the Canadian Ministry of Transportation, as an emergency airstrip, by the request of the Department of National Defence to support the Pinetree Line. The runway was extended to 8,200 feet, after initially being built as a 6,000 foot concrete runway.  The airstrip would function as a detachment of RCAF Station Parent, under the control of the Lac St. Denis Air Defence Control Centre (ADCC).

The Casey airstrip was being considered to be a home for a RCAF squadron, and at one time considered to be a site for another BOMARC site.

The airfield was sold to a private firm in November 1964 but was then abandoned as a regulated airfield.

Post-Closure

In the early 1970s planes spraying for the spruce budworm used the airstrip to fill up with larvacide, fuel, and take off.  On June 9, 1973 one such plane crashed on take off at the end of the runway after briefly being airborne.

In November 1992 a Convair 580, C-GGWJ, piloted by Raymond Boulanger landed after being pursued by an CF-18 fighters, found to be loaded with 4,343 kilos of cocaine flown from Colombia (said to be worth C$ 2.7 billion).

Today, the airstrip is popular as a fly-in and camping area for recreational light aircraft enthusiasts.

References

Royal Canadian Air Force
Cold War military history of Canada